Iolaus leonis, the Sierra Leone sapphire, is a butterfly in the family Lycaenidae. It is found in Guinea, Sierra Leone, Liberia and Ivory Coast. The habitat consists of gallery forests.

References

Butterflies described in 1928
Iolaus (butterfly)